Newtown is a former settlement in Mariposa County, California. It lay at an elevation of 1821 feet (555 m).

References

Former settlements in Mariposa County, California
Former populated places in California